Argyrotaenia franciscana, the orange tortrix or apple skinworm,  is a moth of the family Tortricidae. It is found from California north to Oregon and Washington.

The length of the forewings is 5.6-9.9 mm. There are at least two, but sometimes more generations per year.

The larvae feed on a wide range of nearly 80 plants, including Malus, Prunus armeniaca, Persea americana, Rubus, Vaccinium, Vitis, Citrus x paradisi, Citrus limon and Pinus radiata. Early instar larvae skeletonize leaves under a silk shelter, while later instars roll, fold, or web leaves together or to fruits. Either the larvae or pupae overwinter. Overwintering can take place in dead leaves, mummified fruits, under buds or on weedy herbaceous plants near the host. Pupation occurs in the final larval shelter.

References

F
Endemic fauna of the United States
Fauna of the California chaparral and woodlands
Moths of North America
Natural history of the San Francisco Bay Area
Moths described in 1879